EN 206+A2 Concrete – Part 1: Specification, performance, production and conformity (formerly EN 206 and EN 206-1 and EN 206+A1) is a European standard elaborated by the CEN/TC 104 "Concrete and related products" technical committee.

See also 
List of EN standards
European Committee for Standardization
EN 197-1: Cement – Part 1 : Composition, specifications and conformity criteria for common cements
EN 197-2: Cement – Part 2 : Conformity evaluation
EN 1992 Eurocode 2: Design of concrete structures

References

External links 
 European Committee for Standardization

Cement
Concrete
Construction standards
00206+A1